Jose Antonio Rodríguez Avelar (born August 25, 1958) is a Mexican former professional boxer in the flyweight division. He is a former WBC and Lineal flyweight Champion.

Professional career
In August 1980, Avelar won his first NABF Championship by Knocking out Alberto Morales.

WBC Flyweight Championship
In his second attempt, Avelar won the WBC and Lineal Flyweight titles by upsetting Shoji Oguma of Japan by T.K.O. in the seventh round. On July 25, 1987, Avelar lost his last bout to an undefeated Miguel Lora for the Colombian's WBC Bantamweight Championship.

See also
List of flyweight boxing champions
List of WBC world champions
List of Mexican boxing world champions

References

External links

 Antonio Avelar - CBZ Profile

Boxers from Jalisco
Sportspeople from Guadalajara, Jalisco
World boxing champions
World Boxing Council champions
World flyweight boxing champions
Flyweight boxers
1958 births
Living people
Mexican male boxers